Bianca Butler (born September 2, 1989 in Laguna Beach, California) is an American pair skater.

She teamed up with Joseph Jacobsen in 2000. They were the 2007 US National junior silver medalists. They qualified for the 2005 Junior Grand Prix Final in their first year on the circuit, and placed sixth.

Although they placed seventh on the day, they were later moved up a spot to a sixth-place finish at the 2007–2008 Junior Grand Prix Final following the retroactive disqualification of first-place-finishers Vera Bazarova & Yuri Larionov due to a positive doping sample from Larionov.

Their partnership ended in February 2009.

Programs 
(with Jacobsen)

Competitive highlights
(with Jacobsen)

References

External links

 Official Site
 
 

American female pair skaters
1989 births
Living people
21st-century American women
20th-century American women